Evilution, a portmanteau of evil and evolution, may refer to:

Music
 Evilution, an album by IllWill, featuring Andy LaRocque, 2002
 Evilution, an album by T.O.Y., 2002
 "Evilution", a song by Datsik from Vitamin D, 2012
 "Evilution", a song by Dio from Strange Highways, 1993
 "Evilution", a song by Dream Evil from United, 2006
 "Evilution", a song by Running Wild from Death or Glory, 1989

Film
 Evilution (film), a horror film of 2009 
 Evilution, a DVD release by Pro-jekt

See also
 Evolution
 Evolution (disambiguation)